Atle Sveinung Eide (born 1957) is a Norwegian businessperson, and since 2007 partner with HitecVision Private Equity.

Eide is a former board member of Fokus Bank, Acta, Cermaq and SalMar. From 2003 to 2007 he was chief executive officer of Marine Harvest.

References

1939 births
Living people
Norwegian businesspeople